Murray McLachlan may refer to:

 Murray McLachlan (musician) (born 1965), British concert pianist
 Murray McLachlan (ice hockey) (born 1948), ice hockey goaltender
 Murray McLachlan (swimmer) (born 1941), South African swimmer

See also
 Murray McLauchlan (born 1948), Canadian singer, songwriter and musician
 McLachlan (surname)